The Roman Catholic Diocese of Beja is a suffragan of the archdiocese of Évora.

History 
Beja lies on the site of Pax Julia, or Paca, of the Romans, and is still surrounded by remains of old Roman walls, partly restored. The diocese was created 10 June 1770. Beja was taken from its Islamic rulers in 1162 by Afonso I of Portugal. Beja Cathedral is an old church, much modernized, of uncertain date.

The chronicler Isidorus Pacensis, of the eighth century, was traditionally said to have been bishop of Beja; but this is now disputed.

See also 
Catholic Church in Portugal

References

External links 
 Official page

Beja
Beja, Roman Catholic Diocese of